Mind of the Raven: Investigations and Adventures with Wolf-Birds is a 1999 book by Bernd Heinrich. Heinrich tells about the process and findings of his long-term researches into raven cognition, offering an "admittedly incomplete if anecdotally rich" portrait of the species.

References

1999 non-fiction books
American non-fiction books
Zoology books
Ornithological literature
Ravens